
Gmina Szubin is an urban-rural gmina (administrative district) in Nakło County, Kuyavian-Pomeranian Voivodeship, in north-central Poland.

Villages
Apart from the town of Szubin, Gmina Szubin contains the villages and settlements of Ameryczka, Bielawy, Brzózki, Chobielin, Chomętowo, Chraplewo, Ciężkowo, Dąbrówka Słupska, Drogosław, Gąbin, Głęboczek, Godzimierz, Grzeczna Panna, Jeziorowo, Kołaczkowo, Koraczewko, Kornelin, Kowalewo, Królikowo, Łachowo, Mąkoszyn, Małe Rudy, Nadjezierze, Nadkanale, Niedźwiady, Olek, Pińsko, Podlaski, Retkowo, Rynarzewo, Rzemieniewice, Samoklęski Duże, Samoklęski Małe, Skórzewo, Słonawy, Słupy, Smarzykowo, Smolniki, Stanisławka, Stary Jarużyn, Suchy Pies, Szaradowo, Szkocja, Szubin-Wieś, Trzciniec, Tur, Wąsosz, Wojsławiec, Wolwark, Wrzosy, Wymysłowo, Zalesie, Zamość, Zazdrość, Żędowo, Zielonowo and Żurczyn.

Neighbouring gminas
Gmina Szubin is bordered by the gminas of Białe Błota, Kcynia, Łabiszyn, Nakło nad Notecią and Żnin.

References
   Polish official population figures 2019 

Szubin
Nakło County